Norðragøta, also just referred to as Gøta is a village on Eysturoy, Faroe Islands.

Overview 

The municipality of Gøta (Gøtu kommuna) was a municipality until 1 January 2009 when it merged with Leirvík into Eysturkommuna. Gøta consists also of the villages Gøtueiði, Gøtugjógv and Syðrugøta. The village lies on Eysturoy's east coast at the bottom of the inlet Gøtuvík. There is a museum called Gøtu Fornminnisavn with the famous house Blásastova. The wooden church in the centre of the village is from 1833.

Gøta is a place of great importance in the history of the Faroe Islands. One of the key figures  in the Icelandic saga, Færeyinga saga, called Tróndur Gøtuskegg (Old Norse: Þrǫ́ndr í Gǫtu) lived here. Trondur (also called Tróndur í Gøtu) was a heathen Viking-chief who ruled all of the islands for a period of time. In the saga Tróndur is represented as the "bad guy" while the "good guy" is Sigmundur Brestisson. Sigmundur Christianised the Faroe Islands for the King of Norway.

Sports
The most popular pastime in Norðragøta is football. The local football team is Víkingur Gøta, formerly known as Gøtu Ítróttarfelag. They play their home games at the Serpugerði Stadium.

Music
Gøta is home to G! Festival, one of the largest music festivals in the Faroe Islands.

Faroese stamps showing Norðragøta

Old houses in Norðragøta
Issued on 5 October 1992, the artist was Jákup Pauli Gregoriussen.

 Text for the stamp edition on stamps.fo: Old Houses in Noðragøta
 Note the web site of the museum: Blasastova.fo

Church of Gøta
The new church of Gøta, issued: 23 September 2002. These were also the Christmas stamps for that year. 

Text on stamps.fo:
 Gøta Church

See also
 List of towns in the Faroe Islands

References

External links
 Faroeislands.dk: Gøta Images and description of all cities on the Faroe Islands.
 Blasastova.fo - museum
 Gota.fo - official homepage (only in Faroese)

Populated places in the Faroe Islands